The swimming competitions at the 2004 Summer Olympics in Athens took place from 14 to 21 August 2004 at the Athens Olympic Aquatic Centre in Marousi. It featured 32 events (16 male, 16 female), a total of 937 swimmers from 152 nations, and the program's changes instituted in the previous Games, including notably the three-phase format (heats, semifinals, and final) for all short-distance races (200 metres and under).

Swimmers from the United States continued to dominate the medal tally with a total of 28, earning twelve golds, nine silver, and seven bronze. Australia still maintained the second spot from Sydney in 2000, but produced a total of 15 more medals (seven golds, five silver, and three bronze) to its historical hardware in swimming. Meanwhile, Japan moved from behind to third overall in the medal board with eight medals after a sterling breaststroke double from Kosuke Kitajima. A total of eight world records and twenty-five Olympic records were set during the competition.

Venue

Swimming events at the 2004 Summer Olympics were held at the Athens Olympic Aquatic Centre, officially known as the Olympic Aquatic Centre of the Athens Olympic Sports Complex (OCO) during the games. Originally built for the 1991 Mediterranean Games, it was refurbished to host swimming, diving, synchronised swimming, and water polo events; it was the first time in the history of the Olympics that all aquatics disciplines had been held at a single venue. Swimming events were held at the main outdoor pool of the complex, which held 10,893 spectators, and was interchangeably used for swimming and water polo events throughout the duration of the games. A plastic-coated tarpaulin roof covering the two outdoor pools of the complex, designed to protect spectators and swimmers from being exposed to the summer heat, was originally planned to be built as part of the renovations. However, due to cost overruns and delays in construction, planners decided to scrap the roof in March 2004, which was criticised by FINA, the governing body of water sports. The venue would ultimately be approved by FINA weeks before the opening of the games in August.

Events
The following events were contested (all pool events were long course, and distances are in metres unless stated):
Freestyle : 50, 100, 200, 400, 800 (women) and 1500 (men);
Backstroke : 100 and 200;
Breaststroke : 100 and 200;
Butterfly : 100 and 200;
Individual medley : 200 and 400; 
Relays: 4×100 free, 4×200 free, and 4×100 medley.

Schedule

Participating nations
A total of 937 swimmers (544 men and 393 women) from 152 nations would compete in swimming events at these Olympic Games. Antigua and Barbuda, Benin, Burkina Faso, Burundi, Cameroon, Cayman Islands, Guyana, and Turkmenistan made their official debut in swimming. Meanwhile, Albania, Libyan Arab Jamahiriya and Norway returned to the sport after long years of absence. Nations with swimmers at the Games are (team size in parentheses):

Medal summary

Results

Men's events

* Swimmers who participated in the heats only and received medals.

Women's events

* Swimmers who participated in the heats only and received medals.

References

External links
Official result book – Swimming

 
2004 Summer Olympics events
2004
Olympics